Aero Sudpacífico was a Mexican regional airline which had its base at the Uruapan International Airport, in Uruapan, Michoacán, where it kept operations between 1990 and 1996.

History 
The airline emerged as Aero Sudpacífico on 1990 because of the need to connect Morelia and Uruapan, this route was serviced by a Britten-Norman BN-2 Islander. In that year the airline acquired another Islander and a Fairchild SA-226TC Metro-II. Due to the success of the Metro II, Aero Sudpacífico acquired two other similar aircraft, and began to fly to Apatzingán, Lázaro Cárdenas, Guadalajara, Zihuatanejo, Zamora and Mexico City.

During 1993 Aero Sudpacífico had many competitors like Aero Cuahonte and AeroLitoral, so that Aero Sudpacífico had the need to acquire an Embraer 120 Brasilia, being the first operator in Mexico of this kind of aircraft. The Embraer Brasilia allowed Aero Sudpacífico to open flights to Querétaro, Monterrey and Celaya, also caused Aero Sudpacífico changed its name to Sudpacífico and also to change the logo of the brand to a golden eagle, as the logo used before It was a Metro-II flying over the horizon. The Embraer 120 finished operations with Sudpacífico on 1995 because of the devaluation of Mexican peso and the high operation costs.

For 1996 (its last year of operations) Aerosudpacífico operated short routes with daily flights from Morelia to Mexico City, Uruapan, Huetamo, Zihuatanejo, Guadalajara, Lázaro Cárdenas, Apatzingán and Ciudad Altamirano. However, the increase in operating costs due to the devaluation of the peso, as well as the loss of various aircraft in accidents and various debts and seizures at different airports forced the airline to cease operations this year.

Destinations 
Sudpacífico opered these destinations during its working.

Historical Fleet 
During its existence Sudpacífico operated the following aircraft:

References 

Defunct airlines of Mexico